Olum is a surname. Notable people with the surname include:

Dick Olum (born 1970), Ugandan military leader
Lawrence Olum (born 1984), Kenyan footballer
Paul Olum (1918–2001), American mathematician, professor of mathematics, and university administrator